The University of Georgia Campus Transit system operates on the campus and vicinity of the university. Campus Transit has an average daily ridership of 39,765.  The system also runs two shuttles on football home game days.

All fixed routes are fare-free and open to anyone including students, faculty, staff, and visitors. The service is funded primarily by a transportation fee paid by students each semester.

Unlike the transit systems found in many college towns, Campus Transit is separate from the Athens Transit system serving Athens-Clarke County.

Routes

Weekday Routes

Night and Weekend Service

Intersession service 

Operates on days when the university is open but classes are not in session. Most weekday routes are run but with only one or two vehicles serving each one.

Fleet

Electric Buses 

As of April 2019, UGA has entered into a contract to add up to 19 new electric buses. The 19 buses were put into service on campus in February 2020. In December 2019, as the University of Georgia was awarded $7.46 million under the Federal Transit Administration's Grants for Buses and Bus Facilities Program, it was announced that 13 additional electric buses would be added to the fleet, which will bring the total number of electric buses on campus to 33. The electric buses will account for a third of the total fleet in 2021, when UGA begins to phase out and decommission older diesel buses.

References

External links
 

Bus transportation in Georgia (U.S. state)
Transportation in Athens, Georgia
Georgia
University of Georgia